Pir Sara may refer to:
 Pir Sara, Masal
 Pir Sara, Shanderman, Masal County
 Pir Sara, Rudbar
 Pir Sara, Sowme'eh Sara